André Giroux (April 30, 1801 – November 18, 1879) was a renowned French photographer and painter. His paintings were mostly landscape art and genre painting, one of which hangs in the Metropolitan Museum of Art. In particular, he restored several genre paintings of medieval ruins and troubadours. Giroux was also a well established art dealer and gave up painting to promote his business selling curiosities.  Giroux's work is extensively discussed in Steven Adams' doctoral thesis from the University of Leeds in 2003.

Background
Born in Paris, he was son to François-Simon-Alphonse Giroux, maker of camera equipment for Louis-Jacques-Mandé Daguerre. He attended École des Beaux-Arts beginning in 1821, and was a student of Jacques-Louis David.

He was also known for using the cliché-verre technique.

Awards
Prix de Rome en Paysage Historique — 1825, Winner (with Chasse de Méléagre)
Légion d'honneur — 1870, Chevalier

External links

References
André Giroux Profile at The Cleveland Museum of Art
André Giroux Profile at J. Paul Getty Museum
André Giroux Profile at Centre for Whistler Studies

1801 births
1879 deaths
Artists from Paris
19th-century French painters
French male painters
French photographers
French landscape painters
Painters of ruins
Prix de Rome for painting
Chevaliers of the Légion d'honneur
École des Beaux-Arts alumni
Pupils of Jacques-Louis David
19th-century male artists